Lasiomyrma (from Greek , "hairy" + , "ant") is a South-East Asian genus of ants in the subfamily Myrmicinae. The genus is mainly known from tropical rainforests in Sundaland.

Species
Lasiomyrma gedensis Terayama & Yamane, 2000 – Java, Indonesia
Lasiomyrma gracilinoda Terayama & Yamane, 2000 – Borneo, Malaysia
Lasiomyrma maryatiae Terayama & Yamane, 2000 – Borneo, Malaysia
Lasiomyrma wiwatwitayai Jaitrong, 2010 – Thailand

References

External links

Myrmicinae
Ant genera
Hymenoptera of Asia